The Great Western Railway (GWR) 2221 Class or County Tank was a class of 4-4-2T steam locomotive, effectively a tank engine version of the 3800 "County" Class 4-4-0 tender locomotives. The two classes had different boilers, standard no 4 for the tender locomotive, and the smaller (by about ) standard no 2 for the tank. 2230 was fitted with the larger boiler when new, but this was unsuccessful and was quickly altered.

Construction
Thirty were built between 1905 and 1912 to replace the 3600 "Birdcage" Class. They were built in three batches of ten, the batches having minor differences. In the final batch the drop in the front framing above the cylinders was curved, the cylinders were also lower, superheaters and top feed were fitted from new. Later in life, the earlier members of the class were fitted with superheaters, and some were given larger bunkers in line with other standard tank classes.

Use
Their work was concentrated on London suburban services. They were replaced by the more versatile GWR 6100 Class from 1931 onwards, the last going in 1934. Their large four coupled driving wheels were suited to high speed running on outer suburban services but acceleration was slower than that of the six coupled, smaller wheeled locomotives.

Reputation
Like the Counties, they had a reputation for rough riding, caused by their short coupled wheelbase and large outside cylinders. None survived into preservation.

See also 
 List of GWR standard classes with two outside cylinders

References

External links 
 2221 'County Tank' class

4-4-2T locomotives
2221 Class
Scrapped locomotives
Standard gauge steam locomotives of Great Britain
Railway locomotives introduced in 1905

Passenger locomotives